Miho Kanno (Kanji:, born 16 April 1990) is a Japanese cricketer. She was a member of the Japanese cricket team which won the bronze medal at the 2010 Asian Games. Kanno was also the part of the national team at the 2013 Women's World Twenty20 Qualifier. 

In April 2019, she was named in Japan's squad for the 2019 ICC Women's Qualifier EAP tournament in Vanuatu. She made her Women's Twenty20 International (WT20I) debut for Japan against Indonesia in the Women's Qualifier EAP tournament on 6 May 2019.

References

External links 
 
 Profile at CricHQ

1990 births
Living people
Japanese women cricketers
Japan women Twenty20 International cricketers
Asian Games bronze medalists for Japan
Asian Games medalists in cricket
Cricketers at the 2010 Asian Games
Hosei University alumni
Sportspeople from Gunma Prefecture
Medalists at the 2010 Asian Games